The 1931 Chico State Wildcats football team represented Chico State Teachers College—now known as California State University, Chico—as a member of the Far Western Conference (FWC) during the 1931 college football season. Led by ninth-year head coach Art Acker, Chico State compiled an overall record of 3–4–1 with a mark of 2–1–1 in conference play, placing in a four-way tie for first in the FWC. No champion was named for the 1931 season. The team was outscored by its opponents 107 to 62 for the season. The Wildcats played home games at College Field in Chico, California.

Schedule

References

Chico State
Chico State Wildcats football seasons
Chico State Wildcats football